La Güera Airport  was located adjacent to La Güera, Western Sahara.

References

Defunct airports in Western Sahara